Jaya Prada Nahata (born Lalitha Rani; 3 April 1962) is an Indian actress and politician. She is hailed as one of the most iconic and influential actresses in both Telugu and Hindi film industries in late '70s, '80s and early '90s. Jayaprada is the recipient of three Filmfare Awards South and has starred in many Telugu and Hindi films along with several Kannada, Tamil, Malayalam, Bengali and Marathi films. She left the film industry at the peak of her career, as she joined the Telugu Desam Party (TDP) in 1994 and entered politics. She was a Member of Parliament (MP) from Rampur, Uttar Pradesh from 2004 to 2014.

Some of her notable films include Anthuleni Katha (1976), Siri Siri Muvva (1976), Sita Kalyanam (1976), Adavi Ramudu (1977), Yamagola (1977), Sanaadi Appanna (1977), Huliya Haalina Mevu (1979), Sargam (1979), Ooriki Monagadu (1981), Kaamchor (1982), Kaviratna Kalidasa (1983), Sagara Sangamam (1983), Tohfa (1984), Sharaabi (1984), Maqsad (1984), Sanjog (1985), Aakhree Raasta (1986), Simhasanam (1986), Sindoor (1987), Samsaram (1988), Elaan-E-Jung (1989), Aaj Ka Arjun (1990), Thanedaar (1990), Maa (1991), Habba (1999), Shabdavedhi (2000), Devadoothan (2000), Pranayam (2011), Ee Bandhana (2007) and Krantiveera Sangolli Rayanna (2012). She won the Filmfare Award for Best Actress – Telugu for her performance in Sagara Sangamam. She has also been awarded Filmfare Special Award for her performance in Siri Siri Muvva and Anthuleni Katha.

She has been considered by many as one of the most beautiful face to have ever graced Indian cinema including Satyajit Ray who called her "the most beautiful face on the Indian screen".

Early life
Jayaprada was born as Lalitha Rani in Rajahmundry, Andhra Pradesh Rajaka family. Her father, Krishna Rao, was a Telugu film financier. Her mother, Neelavani, was a home-maker. Lalitha attended a Telugu medium school in Rajahmundry and was also enrolled in dance and music classes at an early age.

Film career

When Jayaprada was a teenager, she performed a dance at her school's annual function. A film director in the audience offered her a three-minute dance number in the Telugu film Bhoomi Kosam (1974).  She was hesitant, but her family encouraged her to accept it. She was paid only 10 rupees for her work in the film, but the rushes of those three minutes of film were shown to the major figures of the Telugu film industry. Major filmmakers offered her starring roles in quality films, and she accepted them. She became a huge star in 1976 with major hit films. Director K. Balachander's black-and-white film Anthuleni Katha (1976) showcased her dramatic skills; K. Viswanath's colour film Siri Siri Muvva (1976) showed her playing a mute girl with excellent dancing skills; and her title role as Sita in the big-budget mythological film Seetha Kalyanam (1976) confirmed her versatility. In 1977, she starred in Adavi Ramudu, which broke box office records and which permanently cemented her star status. The song "Aaresukoboyi Paresukunnanu" performed by Prada and co-star N.T. Rama Rao (NTR) became a mass hit. Important filmmakers were casting her and repeating her in their films. Filmmaker Vijay introduced her to Kannada cinema in his 1977 super-hit movie Sanaadi Appanna alongside Kannada matinee idol Dr. Rajkumar. The movie is also known to be the only movie to feature shehnai rendition by Ustad Bismillah Khan.

In 1979, K. Balachander repeated her in the Tamil film Ninaithale Inikkum opposite Kamal Haasan and Rajinikanth in which she played a terminally-ill patient. She continued to act in more films in Telugu opposite actors such as NTR, ANR, Krishna, Krishnam Raju and Sobhan Babu throughout the 70s and 80s. She acted in highest number of films with Krishna like Sri Rajeshwari vilas coffee club (1976), Bhale Krishnudu (1980), Ooruki Monagadu (1981), Mundadugu (1983),  Prajarajyam (1983) and Singhasan (1986),. K. Viswanath remade Siri Siri Muvva (1976) in Hindi as Sargam, introducing Jayaprada to Bollywood in 1979. The film was successful and she became a star there as well. She earned her first Filmfare nomination as Best Actress but couldn't capitalize on her success since she couldn't speak Hindi.

In 1981, she starred in the critically acclaimed Tamil film 47 Natkal  and simultaneously made Telugu film 47 Rojulu by filmmaker K. Balachander in which Chiranjeevi played her villainous, bigamist husband. After she took Hindi lessons, director K. Vishwanath relaunched her in Hindi films, with Kaamchor where she spoke Hindi fluently for the first time. Saagara Sangamam directed by K. Vishwanath, starring Kamal Haasan proved to be a milestone in her career, winning her many accolades including Filmfare Award for Best Actress - Telugu in 1983. She was now able to consistently work in Hindi films, and earned two more Filmfare nominations as Best Actress for playing Amitabh Bachchan's endearing girlfriend in Prakash Mehra's Sharaabi (1984) and for her challenging double role in K. Vishwanath's Sanjog (1985).

Jayaprada made a successful team not just with Amitabh Bachchan and Jeetendra, but also with her immediate screen rival Sridevi, with whom she has acted in about a dozen films. Their hit Telugu film Devatha (1982), where they played sisters who made huge sacrifices for each other, was remade into the hit Hindi film Tohfa (1984). These films endeared Jayaprada to the traditional conservative section of film goers and she amassed a huge female fan following as well. It was an image that would serve her well when she started a new career as a politician. In 1985, she acted in the Malayalam film Iniyum Kadha Thudarum directed by Joshiy starring Mammootty, Baby Shalini and Ambika.

Indian director Satyajit Ray described her as one of the prettiest women in the world. Although she has acted in Bengali films, she has never worked for Ray. (She claimed that Ray had her in mind for a film, but his illness and subsequent death prevented their collaboration).

Jayaprada continued to act as a heroine mainly opposite Amitabh and Jeetendra during the early 1990s. She also acted in some significant Kannada films as the heroine. From 1994 onwards, she cut back on film assignments and got more involved with a political career on call by her co-star NTR.

In 2000, she acted in the Malayalam film Devadoothan, starring Mohanlal, directed by Sibi Malayil. The film garnered immensely popular reviews from the critics but failed at the box office. But it met with great appreciation from the audience when released in Home Media and when aired on television. his movie had evergreen hit songs. She also starred for the last time, opposite Kannada super star Dr. Rajkumar in Shabdavedi. In 2002, she stepped into the Marathi film industry by being a guest in the movie Aadhaar. Thus far, she has acted in eight languages and has completed 300 films during a 30-year film career. In 2004, she acted in Ee Snehatheerathu, a Malayalam film as Kunchacko Boban's mother. She started playing mature roles.

She also owns the Jayaprada Theater in Chennai.

In 2011, she returned to Malayalam cinema with a strong role in Pranayam, alongside Mohanlal and Anupam Kher. She played "Grace" in this film, which won her critical acclaim and several awards. Her 2012 Kannada film Krantiveera Sangolli Rayanna (Sangolli Rayanna) that saw her donning the historical role of courageous Kittur Chennamma, completed 100 days at the box office.

Personal life
On 22 February 1986, she married producer Srikanth Nahata, who was already married to Chandra and had 3 children. This marriage stirred a lot of controversy, especially since Nahata did not divorce his wife and had children with his first wife after marrying Jayaprada.

Political career
Jayaprada joined the Telugu Desam Party (TDP) in 1994 at the invitation of its founder N. T. Rama Rao, on the eve of the assembly elections, and rose quickly through the ranks. At that time there was speculation that she would run for election, but she preferred not to make her electoral debut, although she was offered a seat by Rao.

She campaigned in several constituencies in 1994. When Rao became the Chief minister in 1994, he appointed one of his sons-in-law Nara Chandrababu Naidu as the Revenue Minister. Soon after the formation of the government, Chandrababu Naidu convinced a majority of the TDP MLAs to elect him as the chief minister and revolted against his father in law. Since most of the legislators had gone over to his side, the Anti Defection Law did not apply and the Telugu Desam Party label passed on to the Chandrababu Naidu faction. During this period, Prada too joined the Chandrababu Naidu faction of the party. She was nominated to the Rajya Sabha representing Andhra Pradesh in 1996. She also held the post of Telugu Mahila President.

Following differences with party Supremo N. Chandrababu Naidu, she left the TDP to join Samajwadi Party. She contested from Rampur parliamentary Constituency in UP during the 2004 General election and got elected with a margin of more than 85000 votes. During her campaign for the Lok Sabha elections in 2009, she was issued a notice by the Election Commission for violating the code of conduct by distributing bindis to women in Rampur's Swar locality. On 11 May 2009, Jayaprada alleged that senior Samajwadi Party leader Azam Khan was distributing nude pictures of her. She was re-elected with a margin of more than 30,000 votes. 

After she came out in open support of the former General Secretary of the Samajwadi Party, Amar Singh, Prada was expelled from the party on 2 February 2010 for allegedly indulging in anti-party activities and damaging the party's secular image. Amar Singh, along with Jayaprada floated his own political party, Rashtriya Lok Manch, in 2011, and fielded candidates in 360 of the 403 seats in Uttar Pradesh in the 2012 assembly polls. However, his party did not win a single seat in these elections. Later she, along with Amar Singh joined the RLD on 10 March 2014 and after that she got the ticket to contest from the Bijnor seat in the 2014 general elections. She, however, lost the election.

She joined the Bharatiya Janata Party in the presence of National General Secretary Bhupender Yadav on 26 March 2019.

Television

Awards

Nandi Awards
 Nandi Award for Best Actress – Anthuleni Katha (1976)

Filmfare Awards South
 Special Award – Siri Siri Muvva & Anthuleni Katha (1976) 
 Best Actress – Telugu – Saagara Sangamam (1983)
 Lifetime Achievement Award – South (2007)

Filmfare Awards

Filmfare Awards South

Other awards
 Kalashree award
 Kala Saraswati Award
 Kinnera Savitri Award
 Rajiv Gandhi Award
 Nargis Dutt Gold Medal
 Shakuntala Kala Rathnam Award
 Uttam Kumar Award
Ever Green Beauty of India at 14th Santosham Film Awards in 2016.
 ANR Achievement Award (2008)
 Venus of Indian Cinema Award from TSR TV9 Film Awards (2011)
 Nana Film Award for Best Actress – Pranayam
 Ujala Asianet Film Awards 2012 – Special Jury Award for Pranayam
 Amrita Film Awards 2012 – Best Actress Award for Pranayam
 Mathrubhumi Kalyan Silks film awards 2012 – Best Character Actress Award for Pranayam
 Kerala Film Producers Association – Surya TV Film Awards 2012 – Outstanding Performance Award for Pranayam
 Asiavision Movie Awards 2011 – Outstanding Performance Award for Pranayam

Filmography

References

External links

 
 

|-

1952 births
Living people
Actresses in Telugu cinema
Actresses in Kannada cinema
Telugu politicians
Actresses in Malayalam cinema
India MPs 2004–2009
Samajwadi Party politicians
Indian actor-politicians
India MPs 2009–2014
Filmfare Awards South winners
Nandi Award winners
Rashtriya Lok Dal politicians
Indian film actresses
20th-century Indian actresses
Lok Sabha members from Uttar Pradesh
21st-century Indian actresses
Rajya Sabha members from Andhra Pradesh
United Progressive Alliance candidates in the 2014 Indian general election
Women members of the Lok Sabha
21st-century Indian women politicians
21st-century Indian politicians
Actresses in Bengali cinema
Bharatiya Janata Party politicians from Uttar Pradesh
Actresses in Marathi cinema
Actresses from Rajahmundry
Telugu Desam Party politicians
Actresses in Tamil cinema
Women in Andhra Pradesh politics
Actresses in Hindi cinema
Santosham Film Awards winners
Women members of the Rajya Sabha
Telugu actresses